The Birkenhead Built-up area is an urban area in England, which covers the towns of Birkenhead, Wallasey, Bebington and Ellesmere Port in both Merseyside and Cheshire. It is defined for certain statistical purposes by NOMIS (National Online Manpower Information System), within the Office of National Statistics.  The area is partly within the Metropolitan Borough of Wirral, and partly within the Cheshire West and Chester local authority.   The definition includes suburbs in the eastern part of the Wirral Peninsula physically contiguous with the main urban areas (such as Moreton and Bromborough), but not physically separate towns and villages (such as Hoylake, Heswall, and Neston).  The area was originally within the historic county of Cheshire.

In the 2011 census, the area was recorded at having a population of 325,264.   The gender makeup of the population was 157,220 male and 168,044 female. The ethnic makeup was 97% white, 2% Asian, and 1% others.  The religious make up of the area was:

References

Birkenhead
Ellesmere Port
Geography of Merseyside
Urban areas of England